Victor Harnanan (born 4 May 1939) is a Guyanese cricketer. He played in four first-class matches for British Guiana from 1959 to 1964.

See also
 List of Guyanese representative cricketers

References

External links
 

1939 births
Living people
Guyanese cricketers
Guyana cricketers